Mykhailo Mykolayovych Kutsyn (born 15 August 1957) is a former Chief of the General Staff and Commander-in-Chief of the Armed Forces of Ukraine. He was appointed Chief of the General Staff by acting president Oleksandr Turchynov on 28 February 2014. Kutsyn was relieved of this post by president Petro Poroshenko on 3 July 2014. Poroshenko thanked Kutsyn for his service and stated he had been shell-shocked on 2 July 2014 while combating the 2014 insurgency in Donbass. He had suffered concussion and was staying at a hospital.

A graduate of tank school, Kutsyn served with the Soviet Army in Kharkiv, Belarus and Germany. He enlisted in the Ukrainian Ground Forces after the nation gained independence in 1991, and was head of the Western Operational Command for six years, before being appointed Deputy Minister of Defence in March 2010.

Awards and decorations

References

External links
Profile at the Official Website of the Ukrainian Ministry of Defence 

1957 births
Living people
People from Zakarpattia Oblast
People of the annexation of Crimea by the Russian Federation
Recipients of the Order of Bohdan Khmelnytsky, 2nd class
Recipients of the Order of Bohdan Khmelnytsky, 3rd class
Soviet military personnel
Lieutenant generals of Ukraine
Pro-Ukrainian people of the 2014 pro-Russian unrest in Ukraine
Chiefs of the General Staff (Ukraine)
Ukrainian military personnel of the war in Donbas